Cihangazi is a village in the Bozüyük District, Bilecik Province, Turkey. Its population is 279 (2021). Before the 2013 reorganisation, it was a town (belde). The name of the village probably refers to an undated tombstone of a certain war hero named Cihangazi (literally "World veteran"). Cihangazi was a more populous town in the past and its population is decreasing because of migration to cities.

References

Villages in Bozüyük District